The University of Dental Medicine, Mandalay, is a university of dental medicine, located in Mandalay, Myanmar. The university offers a six-year bachelor's degree program in dental surgery. Graduate and doctoral studies are now available at the University of Dental Medicine, Mandalay. The annual intake into both dental universities is 300.

Programs
The university offers BDS degree for undergraduate students .
Master's degree for eight specialities in dentistry such as MDSc (oral and maxillofacial surgery), MDSc (oral medicine and oral pathology), MDSc(prosthodontics), MDSc (conservative dentistry), MDSc (orthodontics), MDSc(Paediatric dentistry), MDSc(periodontics), MDSc (preventive and community dentistry), Dr.Dent.Sc (Doctor of Dental Science) and graduate diplomas in dental science (DipDSc).

Coursework
The B.D.S. coursework extends over six years.

Subjects

First B.D.S.
Myanmar
English
Mathematics and Statistics
Physics
Chemistry
Biology, (Botany and Zoology)
Basic Computer Science
Behavioral Sciences
Introduction of Human Anatomy
Introduction Physiology
Introduction of Biochemistry
Introduction of Oral Biological Science

Second B.D.S.
Anatomy
Physiology
Biochemistry
Oral Biological Science

Third B.D.S. 
General pathology
Microbiology
Pharmacology
Prosthodontics
Conservative Dentistry

Fourth B.D.S.  
Preventive and Social Medicine, Preventive and Community Dentistry, Periodontology
General Medicine
General Surgery
Oral Medicine and Oral and Maxillofacial Surgery
Orthodontics
Paediatric Dentistry

Final B.DS. 
Oral Medicine
Oral and Maxillofacial Surgery
Orthodontics
Paediatric Dentistry
Prosthodontics
Conservative Dentistry
Preventive and Community Dentistry, Periodontology

House Surgeon Training
All students, after a successful completion of Final B.D.S. Examination, continue on to hands-on training for a period of 1 year as house surgeons in the recognized teaching hospitals.
Only after the completion of house-surgeonship, is the student awarded the B.D.S. degree.

Post-graduate courses
I. Doctorate Courses
1. Doctorate degree in Oral Medicine, Oral Biological Science, Prosthodontics, Conservative Dentistry, Paediatric Dentistry, Orthodontics, Periodontology
II. Master Courses in Oral and Maxillofacial Surgery, Oral Biological Science, Prosthodontics, Conservative Dentistry, Paediatric Dentistry, Orthodontics, Periodontology, Preventive and Community Dentistry
III. Diploma Courses
1. Diploma of Dental Science (General Practice)
2. Diploma of Dental Science (Dental Implantology)
IV. Certificate Courses
1. Certificate in Dental Nursing
2. Dental Implant Training Hands-on

Official Publication
Journal of Clinical Dentistry and Related Research "http://jcdrr-udmm.com/jcdrr">

Leadership

The University of Dental Medicine, Mandalay has been headed by an academic dean known as a rector.
1. 1998–2009: Mya Thaw
2. 2009–2012: Thein Kyu
3. 2012–2015: Shwe Toe
4. 2015–2019: Sun Sun Win
5. 2020–Present: Ko Ko

Overseas Partner Institutions
Kyushu Dental University, Japan
Hiroshima University, Japan
Kagoshima University, Japan
Chosun University, Korea

Gallery

References

Educational institutions established in 1998
Medical schools in Myanmar
1998 establishments in Myanmar
Universities and colleges in Mandalay